Dyschirius agnatus is a species of ground beetle in the subfamily Scaritinae. It was described by Victor Motschulsky in 1844.

References

agnatus
Beetles described in 1844